United Nations Security Council resolution 995, adopted unanimously on 26 May 1995, after recalling resolutions 621 (1988), 658 (1990), 690 (1991), 725 (1991), 809 (1993), 907 (1994) and 973 (1995), the Council dispatched a mission to the Western Sahara and extended the mandate of United Nations Mission for the Referendum in Western Sahara (MINURSO) until 30 June 1995.

The Security Council was determined to hold a free, fair and impartial referendum for self-determination of the people of Western Sahara in accordance with the Settlement Plan. Progress in identifying potential voters was commended, however certain practices were hampering the efforts of MINURSO. In this context, it was decided to send a mission to the region in order to accelerate the process. A further extension of MINURSO would be considered.

See also
 History of Western Sahara
 List of United Nations Security Council Resolutions 901 to 1000 (1994–1995)
 Polisario Front
 Sahrawi Arab Democratic Republic
 Moroccan Western Sahara Wall

References

External links
 
Text of the Resolution at undocs.org

 0995
 0995
1995 in Western Sahara
May 1995 events